The Return of Ringo is a 1965 Italian Spaghetti Western film directed by Duccio Tessari and the sequel to the earlier film A Pistol for Ringo.

Like its predecessor, the film features a score composed by Ennio Morricone and stars Giuliano Gemma (billed as 'Montgomery Wood') alongside Fernando Sancho, Nieves Navarro, George Martin, Antonio Casas, and Hally Hammond. The film's story is a loose retelling of Homer's Odyssey and is not a continuation of the plot of the previous Ringo film.

Cast

Music

All music by Ennio Morricone.

 "Il ritorno di Ringo – Main Titles" – 2:16 (Lyrics and vocals by Maurizio Graf)
 "The Disguise" – 2:23
 "Mariachi #1" – 1:51
 "Violence" – 5:54
 "Sheriff Carson" – 1:20
 "The Fuentes" – 1:08
 "Mariachi #2" – 2:03
 "Main Titles Instrumental" – 1:26
 "Barnaba's Bamba" – 2:34
 "The Wedding and The Revenge" – 1:28
 "The Funeral" – 2:03
 "Peace Comes Back in Mimbres" – 2:20

Release
The Return of Ringo was released in December 1965 in Italy. The film was the third highest-grossing film in Italy in 1965 behind For a Few Dollars More and A Pistol for Ringo.

Reception
From contemporary reviews, the Monthly Film Bulletin that the film's story is "treated with an imagination unequaled in other Italian Westerns." The review continued that "what makes the film more than merely clever is the handing of its theme: as in the second half of The Odyssey, the hero-treated by all as dead-has to rediscover his identity." The review during the film's climax and ending "Tessari shiningly confirms his sense of the poetic." "Hawk." of Variety described the film as "fair-to-middlin'" noting the cliches the film had, but that Tessari "keeps things lively, alternating action alternating action and humor" while noting the violence in the film "bordered on sadism."  "Hawk." found the film to be superior to A Pistol for Ringo.

References

Bibliography

External links
 

1965 films
Spaghetti Western films
1965 Western (genre) films
1960s Italian-language films
Films directed by Duccio Tessari
Films scored by Ennio Morricone
Italian sequel films
Films shot in Almería
Films based on the Odyssey
Modern adaptations of the Odyssey
1960s Italian films